WCUM (1450 AM) is a radio station broadcasting a Spanish tropical format. Licensed to Bridgeport, Connecticut, United States, it serves the Bridgeport area.  The station is owned by Radio Cumbre Broadcasting.

The station was known as WNAB until 1985 when it left the air.  It returned with an oldies format later that year as WJBX.

References

External links

Mass media in Bridgeport, Connecticut
CUM
Mass media in Fairfield County, Connecticut
Radio stations established in 1941
1941 establishments in Connecticut
CUM